Prasit Piladuang (born July 7, 1994) is a Thai indoor volleyball player. He is a currently playing for Air Force.

Career
Prasit played with the Sa Kaeo youth team in 2009. He played for Chonburi between 2011–2014 and later for Krungkao for the 2014/15 season.

Clubs
  Sisaket Suandusit (2011)
  Chonburi (2011–2014)
  Krungkao (2014–2015)
  Rajamangala Thanyaburi (2015–2016)
  Air Force (2016–present)

Award

Clubs 
 2014 Thai-Denmark Super League -  Champion, with Chonburi
 2016–17 Thailand League -  Champion, with Air Force
 2017 Thai–Denmark Super League -  Runner-Up, with Air Force
 2017–18 Thailand League -  Champion, with Air Force
 2017–18 Thailand League -  Champion, with Air Force
 2019 Thai–Denmark Super League -  Runner-Up, with Air Force

References

1994 births
Living people
Prasit Piladuang
Prasit Piladuang